Miscophini is a tribe of square-headed wasps in the family Crabronidae. There are about 17 genera and at least 570 described species in Miscophini.

Genera
These 17 genera belong to the tribe Miscophini:

 Aha Menke, 1977
 Auchenophorus R. Turner, 1907
 Larrissa Pulawski, 2012
 Larrisson Menke, 1967
 Lyroda Say, 1837
 Miscophoidellus Menke in Bohart and Menke, 1976
 Miscophoides Brauns in Kohl, 1897
 Miscophus Jurine, 1807
 Namiscophus Lomholdt, 1985
 Nitela Latreille, 1809
 Paranysson Guérin-Méneville, 1844
 Plenoculus W. Fox, 1893
 Saliostethoides Arnold, 1924
 Saliostethus Brauns in Kohl, 1897
 Sericophorus F. Smith, 1851
 Solierella Spinola, 1851
 Sphodrotes Kohl, 1889

References

Crabronidae
Articles created by Qbugbot